Thousands Cheer is a 1943 American musical comedy film directed by George Sidney and released by Metro-Goldwyn-Mayer. Produced at the height of the Second World War, the film was intended as a morale booster for American troops and their families.

Plot
The film is essentially a two-part program. The first half consists of a romantic comedy storyline involving an aerialist, played by Gene Kelly, who is drafted into the US Army but really wants to join the Air Force. During training, he falls in love with Kathryn (played by Kathryn Grayson), the daughter of his commanding officer, who has similarly put her singing career on hold in order to serve by providing entertainment for the troops. Unusually for this type of a film (and for this era of Hollywood), the character Kathryn has only recently met her father for the first time since she was a baby, her parents having separated but remaining married. A related subplot has Kathryn conniving to get her parents (played by John Boles and Mary Astor) to reconcile. During the first part of the film, Grayson sings several numbers and Kelly performs one of his most famous routines, dancing with a mop as a partner.

The secondary plot involves preparations for a major live show for the soldiers which will feature many MGM musical and comedy stars. For the second half of the film, all pretenses of a storyline are effectively abandoned as the film instead becomes a variety showcase of comedy, song, and dance, with all of the performers (save Kelly and Grayson) appearing as themselves. The show portion is hosted by Mickey Rooney.

Cast

Guest stars
Performing as "guest stars" in the film's show segment were: Judy Garland, Lena Horne, Red Skelton, Ann Sothern, Lucille Ball, Frank Morgan, Virginia O'Brien, Eleanor Powell, Marilyn Maxwell, June Allyson, Gloria DeHaven, Donna Reed, Margaret O'Brien, the Kay Kyser Orchestra and others. Pianist-conductor José Iturbi appears as himself in both segments of the film; this was his first acting role in a film and he would go on to make several more appearances (usually playing himself) in MGM musicals.

Musical numbers
Highlights included a performance of "Let Me Call You Sweetheart" by Kelly and a mop, "Honeysuckle Rose" by Horne and Benny Carter's band, a tap dance solo by Powell (making her first color film and her final MGM movie until 1950's Duchess of Idaho), Kay Kyser's band delivering a frantic and humorous medley of "I Dug a Ditch in Wichita"/"Should I?", and a Garland performance (with classical pianist Jose Iturbi) of Roger Edens' "The Joint is Really Jumpin' in Carnegie Hall" which includes an early use of the word "rock" in a musical sense.  In the phone scene with Grayson, Iturbi performs an excerpt from Franz Liszt's Rhapsodie #11.

"I Dug a Ditch in Wichita", a song told from the point of view of a soldier who used to dig ditches, is the movie's underlying theme song, performed several times in the film with different arrangements and approaches, climaxing in the above-mentioned Kay Kyser performance which runs four and a half minutes and showcases several of his featured performers and including a few verses of another song, "Would I?". Grayson also sings a version, using an exaggerated (and out-of-character) "cowboy" accent, and Kelly dances to an instrumental version, using a mop as a partner.
 
After a brief resumption (and resolution) of the earlier storyline, the film ends with Grayson leading an international chorus of men (the United Nations Chorus) in a song pleading for world peace. The song, entitled "United Nations on the March", actually predates the establishment of the United Nations political body by two years, but not the Declaration by United Nations which was made on 1 January 1942. The song used music by Dmitri Shostakovich from his famous "Song of the Counterplan" (the title song for the 1932 movie Counterplan), but an English-language text had nothing to do with the original Russian lyrics. Due to misinterpretation of the name of the song's American version, some popular Russian media (e.g. Lenta.ru) reported that Shostakovich composed "the official UN Anthem".

Reception
According to MGM records the film earned $3,751,000 in the US and Canada and $2,135,000 elsewhere resulting in a profit of $2,228,000.

The New York Times : "a veritable grab-bag of delights. Musically there is something for all tastes, from Jose Iturbi to boogie-woogie, from Kathryn Grayson and Sempra Libera to Judy Garland and The Joint is Really Jumping!. It would have been easy for Metro's labour to result in a top-heavy production under a less resourceful producer than Joe Pasternak. His steadying hand is quite evident."

The New York Herald Tribune : "a prodigal and sumptuous picture. It is [Gene] Kelly who saves the picture from being merely a parade of personalities - Judy Garland is attractive as she gets Iturbi to bang out some swing rhythms on the piano.  - George Sidney has staged it expansively."

Awards
The film was nominated for three Academy Awards; Best Cinematography, Best Score and Best Art Direction (Cedric Gibbons, Daniel B. Cathcart, Edwin B. Willis, Jacques Mersereau).

"Honeysuckle Rose" was nominated for the American Film Institute's 2004 list AFI's 100 Years...100 Songs.

References

Further reading

External links

 
 
 
 
 
 
 The Judy Garland Online Discography "Thousands Cheer" pages.

1943 films
1943 musical comedy films
1943 romantic comedy films
American musical comedy films
American romantic comedy films
American romantic musical films
Films directed by George Sidney
Films set in New York City
Metro-Goldwyn-Mayer films
Military humor in film
Films produced by Joe Pasternak
1940s English-language films
1940s American films